Maorineta is a genus of dwarf spiders that was first described by Alfred Frank Millidge in 1988.

Species
 it contains nine species, found in Indonesia, Kiribati, Marshall Islands, and New Zealand:
Maorineta acerba Millidge, 1988 – New Zealand
Maorineta ambigua Millidge, 1991 – Marshall Is., Caroline Is., Cook Is.
Maorineta gentilis Millidge, 1988 – New Zealand
Maorineta minor Millidge, 1988 – New Zealand
Maorineta mollis Millidge, 1988 – New Zealand
Maorineta sulcata Millidge, 1988 – New Zealand
Maorineta tibialis Millidge, 1988 (type) – New Zealand
Maorineta tumida Millidge, 1988 – New Zealand

See also
 List of Linyphiidae species (I–P)

References

Araneomorphae genera
Linyphiidae
Spiders of Asia
Spiders of New Zealand